Hiroyuki Enoki (榎 洋之 Enoki Hiroyuki, born 14 September 1979 in Akita, Akita, Japan) is a Japanese former professional boxer who fights at featherweight and is the former Japanese and OPBF featherweight champion.

Professional career 
Enoki turned professional in August 1998 in Yokohama, Japan. In his debut Enoki defeated fellow Japanese debutant Koyu Nakajima with a first round knockout.

After twenty-one unbeaten fights Enoki beat Akinori Kanai for the Japanese featherweight title in January 2005.

Enoki challenged WBA featherweight champion, Chris John of Indonesia, October 24, 2008 at Korakuen Hall, Tokyo, Japan for a chance to win the world title, but finally lost the fight unanimously by scores of 110-118, 110-118 and 111-117.

Professional boxing record 

{|class="wikitable" style="text-align:center; font-size:95%"
|-
!Result
!Record
!Opponent
!Type
!Round
!Date
!Location
!Notes

|- align=center
|Loss
|28-4-2
|align=left| Alberto Garza
|
|
|
|align=left|
|align=left|
|- align=center
|Loss
|28-3-2
|align=left| Satoshi Hosono
|
|
|
|align=left|
|align=left|For OPBF Feather Title
|- align=center
|Loss
|28-2-2
|align=left| Lee Ryol-li
|
|
|
|align=left|
|align=left|
|- align=center
|Win
|28-1-2
|align=left| Ardi Diego
|
|
|
|align=left|
|align=left|
|- align=center
|Loss
|27-1-2
|align=left| Chris John
|
|
|
|align=left|
|align=left|For World Boxing Association World Feather Title
|- align=center
|style="background: #B0C4DE"|Draw
|27-0-2
|align=left| Takahiro Ao
|
|
|
|align=left|
|align=left|Retained Japanese and OBPF featherweight titles
|- align=center
|Win
|27-0-1
|align=left| Makyo Sugita
|
|
|
|align=left|
|align=left|Retained  OBPF featherweight title
|- align=center
|Win
|26-0-1
|align=left| Achhan Buahom
|
|
|
|align=left|
|align=left|
|- align=center
|Win
|25-0-1
|align=left| Nedal Hussein
|
|
|
|align=left|
|align=left|Retained OPBF Feather Title
|- align=center
|Win
|24-0-1
|align=left| Dentaksin Noinai Sportschool
|
|
|
|align=left|
|align=left|Won OPBF Feather Title
|- align=center
|Win
|23-0-1
|align=left| Koji Umetsu
|
|
|
|align=left|
|align=left|Retained Japanese Feather Title
|- align=center
|Win
|22-0-1
|align=left| Zaiki Takemoto
|
|
|
|align=left|
|align=left|Retained Japanese Feather Title
|- align=center
|Win
|21-0-1
|align=left| Akinori Kanai
|
|
|
|align=left|
|align=left|Retained Japanese Feather Title
|- align=center
|Win
|20-0-1
|align=left| Dainoshin Kuma
|
|
|
|align=left|
|align=left|Won Japanese Feather Title
|- align=center
|Win
|19-0-1
|align=left| Seiji Funami
|
|
|
|align=left|
|align=left|
|- align=center
|Win
|18-0-1
|align=left| Anurak Tamachard
|
|
|
|align=left|
|align=left|
|- align=center
|Win
|17-0-1
|align=left| Goji Mukai
|
|
|
|align=left|
|align=left|
|- align=center
|Win
|16-0-1
|align=left| Chole Sithgorson
|
|
|
|align=left|
|align=left|
|- align=center
|Win
|15-0-1
|align=left| Masatomi Suzuki
|
|
|
|align=left|
|align=left|
|- align=center
|Win
|14-0-1
|align=left| Yoshio Hattori
|
|
|
|align=left|
|align=left|
|- align=center
|style="background: #B0C4DE"|Draw
|13-0-1
|align=left| Jae Kwang Jung
|
|
|
|align=left|
|align=left|
|- align=center
|Win
|13-0
|align=left| Tomoyuki Kusama
|
|
|
|align=left|
|align=left|
|- align=center
|Win
|12-0
|align=left| Siengthip Sitsyasei
|
|
|
|align=left|
|align=left|
|- align=center
|Win
|11-0
|align=left| Naoya Hirahara
|
|
|
|align=left|
|align=left|
|- align=center
|Win
|10-0
|align=left| Shigeo Hori
|
|
|
|align=left|
|align=left|
|- align=center
|Win
|9-0
|align=left| Kanta Someya
|
|
|
|align=left|
|align=left|
|- align=center
|Win
|8-0
|align=left| Kanta Someya
|
|
|
|align=left|
|align=left|
|- align=center
|Win
|7-0
|align=left| Naohisa Masuda
|
|
|
|align=left|
|align=left|
|- align=center
|Win
|6-0
|align=left| Yoichi Matsumoto
|
|
|
|align=left|
|align=left|
|- align=center
|Win
|5-0
|align=left| Zaiki Takemoto
|
|
|
|align=left|
|align=left|
|- align=center
|Win
|4-0
|align=left| Takashi Nishihara
|
|
|
|align=left|
|align=left|
|- align=center
|Win
|3-0
|align=left| Kiyoshi Watanabe
|
|
|
|align=left|
|align=left|
|- align=center
|Win
|2-0
|align=left| Takashi Nishihara
|
|
|
|align=left|
|align=left|
|- align=center
|Win
|1-0
|align=left| Koyu Nakajima
|
|
|
|align=left|
|align=left|
|- align=center

TV series appearances
Enoki made appearances in NHK TV series, "Watashi no Aozora" in 2000.

Kanano alumni
A former professional sumo wrestler,  Takekaze Akira is his classmate at Kanaashi Agricultural High School.

Personal life

He was born and raised in Tegatayama Nakamachi, Akita, and attended Hiroomote Elementary School and Joto Junior High School. He has an older brother, and their father died in the 2010s.

References

External links 
 

1979 births
Living people
Hiroomote Elementary School alumni
Sportspeople from Akita Prefecture
Sportspeople from Tokyo
Japanese male boxers
People from Akita (city)
Featherweight boxers